Setun  was a computer developed in 1958 at Moscow State University. It was built under the leadership of Sergei Sobolev and Nikolay Brusentsov. It was the most modern ternary computer, using the balanced ternary numeral system and three-valued ternary logic instead of the two-valued binary logic prevalent in other computers.

Overview
The computer was built to fulfill the needs of Moscow State University. It was manufactured at the Kazan Mathematical plant. Fifty computers were built from 1959 until 1965, when production was halted. The characteristic operating memory consisted of 81 words of memory, each word composed of 18 trits (ternary digits) with additional 1944 words on magnetic drum (total of about 7 KB). Between 1965 and 1970, a regular binary computer was used at Moscow State University to replace it. Although this replacement binary computer performed equally well, it was 2.5 times the cost of the Setun.

In 1970, a new ternary computer architecture, the Setun-70, was developed. Edsger W. Dijkstra's ideas of structured programming were implemented in the hardware of this computer. The short instructions set was developed and implemented by Nikolay Brusentsov independently from RISC architecture principles.

The Setun-70 hardware architecture was transformed into the Dialogue System of Structured Programming (DSSP). DSSP emulates the "Setun 70" architecture on binary computers, thus it fulfills the advantages of structured programming. DSSP programming language has similar syntax to the Forth programming language but has a different sequence of base instructions, especially conditional jump instructions. DSSP was developed by Nikolay Brusentsov and doctoral students in the 1980s at Moscow State University. A 32-bit version was implemented in 1989.

References

Early computers
Soviet computer systems
Soviet inventions